Martin Wilke (1903-1993) was a German type designer, mostly of script faces.  He studied at the School of Arts and Crafts or School of Applied Arts in Berlin in 1921.  After 1923, he was hired by studio of Wilhelm Deffke and later became an independent graphic designer.

Fonts Designed

References

1903 births
1993 deaths
German graphic designers
German typographers and type designers